Grimms is an unincorporated community located in the town of Cato, Manitowoc County, Wisconsin, United States.

History
A post office called Grimms was established in 1874, and remained in operation until it was discontinued in 1955. Grimms was named in honor of a local pioneer settler.

Notable people
Thomas Gleeson, farmer and Wisconsin State Assemblyman, lived in Grimms.
Romy Gosz, polka musician, was born in Grimms

Notes

Unincorporated communities in Manitowoc County, Wisconsin
Unincorporated communities in Wisconsin